Thorn Lake is a dry high-desert lake in Lake County in the U.S. state of Oregon.

Thorn Lake has been dry for many years, Doctor  E. D Cope, a scientist traveling through the area in 1889, noted that Thorn Lake was a dry playa at that time. A 2008 topographic map of Oregon indicates that Thorn Lake is dry.

See also 
 List of lakes in Oregon

References

Lakes of Oregon
Lakes of Lake County, Oregon
Endorheic lakes of Oregon